Ian Burfield is an English actor, who has often played roles as police officers and detectives on television. He appeared in 12 episodes of The Bill, 39 episodes of EastEnders, and played the part of a Tweed Coat Fingerman in 2005 film V for Vendetta. He is also a company member of the National Theatre, and has acted in two plays which were screened in cinemas around the UK as part of the National Theatre Live scheme. Since September 2018, Burfield has been a recurring character in EastEnders as Detective Inspector/Detective Chief Inspector Peter Arthurs.

Selected filmography

Film

Television

Theatre

External links 
 

Living people
English male television actors
English male film actors
Year of birth missing (living people)